The 1984 Giro d'Italia was the 67th edition of the Giro d'Italia, one of cycling's Grand Tours. The field consisted of 170 riders, and 143 riders finished the race.

By rider

By nationality

References

1984 Giro d'Italia
1984